Yellow Bird may refer to:

 Operation Yellowbird, a covert operation after the June 4 crackdown in Tiananmen Square in 1989 that helped dissidents flee overseas via Hong Kong
 Yellow warbler, a bird in the genus Setophaga
 Yellow Bird (cocktail), a Caribbean, IBA official cocktail
 Northeast Airlines, a US airline

Media
 the English rendering of the popular Haitian song "Choucoune", first released by the Norman Luboff Choir
 Yellow Bird (company), a Swedish film and television production company
 The Yellow Bird, a 2001 film adaptation of a 1946 short story by Tennessee Williams of the same name
 Yellowbird (film), a 2014 film
 A Yellow Bird, a 2016 French-Singaporean film
 Yellow Bird, a project of Peter Shelley and Marty Wilde 1974

People
 Yellow Bird, a Sioux medicine man mentioned as instrumental in accounts of the Wounded Knee massacre  
 Yellow Bird (chief), chief of the Walla Walla Tribe
 Yellow Bird, alternate name for Cherokee novelist John Rollin Ridge
 Yellow Bird, alternate name for Cherokee politician John Ridge, father of John Rollin Ridge

Transportation
 Ruf CTR "Yellowbird", a limited production sports car based on the Porsche 911 

fr:Yellow Bird